Alexander I of Epirus (c. 371 BC – 331 BC), also known as Alexander Molossus, was a king of Epirus (343/2–331 BC) of the Aeacid dynasty. As the son of Neoptolemus I and brother of Olympias, Alexander I was an uncle, and a brother-in-law, of Alexander the Great. He was also an uncle of Pyrrhus of Epirus, (Aeacides of Epirus was a cousin of Alexander I and the father of Pyrrhus).

Life
Neoptolemus I ruled jointly with his brother Arybbas. When Neoptolemus died in c. 357 BC, his son Alexander was only a child and Arrybas became the sole king.  In c. 350 BC, Alexander was brought to the court of Philip II of Macedon in order to protect him. In 343/2 in his late 20s, Philip made him king of Epirus, after dethroning his uncle Arybbas.

When Olympias was repudiated by her husband in 337 BC, she went to her brother, and endeavoured to induce him to make war on Philip. Alexander, however, declined the contest, and formed a second alliance with Philip by agreeing to marry the daughter of Philip (Alexander's niece) Cleopatra. During the wedding in 336 BC, Philip was assassinated by Pausanias of Orestis.

In 334 BC, Alexander I, at the request of the Greek colony of Taras (in Magna Graecia), crossed over into Italy, to aid them in battle against several Italic tribes, including the Lucanians and Bruttii. After a victory over the Samnites and Lucanians near Paestum in 332 BC, he made a treaty with the Romans. He then took Heraclea from the Lucanians, and Terina and Sipontum from the Bruttii. Through the treachery of some Lucanian exiles, he was compelled to engage under unfavourable circumstances in the Battle of Pandosia and was killed by a Lucanian. He left a son, Neoptolemus, and a daughter, Cadmea.

In a famous passage, Livy speculates on what would have been the outcome of a military showdown between Alexander the Great and the Roman Republic. He reports that as Alexander of Epirus lay mortally wounded on the battlefield at Pandosia he compared his fortunes to those of his famous nephew and said that the latter "waged war against women".

References

External links
Lendering, Jona. "Alexander of Molossis". Livius.org, 2004. Birth and kingship dates are incorrect)

 
 

Rulers of Ancient Epirus
4th-century BC Greek people
Ancient Greek generals
Family of Alexander the Great
Monarchs killed in action
Ancient Greeks killed in battle
4th-century BC rulers
Courtiers of Philip II of Macedon
Ancient Epirotes
370s BC births
331 BC deaths